Randuper (Two people) is a 2017 Malayalam movie directed by Prem Shankar. The movie has Bipin Basil Paulose and Santhy Balachandran in the lead roles, with Suraj Venjaramood and Alencier making short appearances. The film was screened at the 22nd International Film Festival of Kerala in 2017 in the International Competition Category. The film had an OTT release in 2021.

Plot synopsis
Two strangers Karun and Ria, both facing existential crisis have a chance encounter and end up spending a night together on the road.

Cast 
 Bipin Basil Paulose as Karun
 Santhy Balachandran as Ria
 Suraj Venjaramoodu
 Sunil Sukhada
 Alencier Ley Lopez

References

External links
 

Films shot in Bangalore
2020s Malayalam-language films
Films scored by Gopi Sundar